Cher Cher or Chercher or Char Char may refer to:
 Cher Cher, Ardabil
 Chercher, East Azerbaijan